William Mayo is the name of:

 William Benson Mayo (1866–1944), chief power engineer of the Ford Motor Company 
 Two of the co-founders of the Mayo Clinic:
 William Worrall Mayo (1819–1911), British-American medical doctor and chemist, father of William James Mayo
 William James Mayo (1861–1939), American physician and surgeon
 William Leonidas Mayo (1861–1917), founder and president of East Texas Normal College
 William Starbuck Mayo (1812–1895), American doctor, traveler and writer
 William Mayo (civil engineer) (c. 1685–1744), who laid out the city of Richmond, Virginia

See also
Bill Mayo (born 1963), American football player